Juniperus seravschanica is a species of juniper. Common names include Pashtun juniper ( ōbəx̌ta, "[a species] which sucks water"; Pashto: پښتني صنوبر).

It ranges from southernmost Kazakhstan through Kyrgyzstan, Tajikistan, eastern Uzbekistan and Turkmenistan, to northern and eastern Afghanistan, northern Pakistan, and Kashmir. Outlying populations are found in the mountains of southeastern Iran – near Kuhbanan, Rabor, and on Kuh-e Khabr in the Hazaran range – and the Al Hajar Mountains of Oman.

Juniperus seravschanica is sometimes classified as a subspecies of J. polycarpos or J. excelsa.

Distribution
Juniperus seravschanica occurs in the higher-elevation forests in Kazakhstan, Kyrgyzstan, Tajikistan and Uzbekistan, which the World Wildlife Fund calls the Gissaro-Alai open woodlands. In this general region Juniperus turkestanica, J. semiglobosa, maples (Acer spp.), almonds (Prunus amygdalus), and roses (Rosa spp.) also occur (although not necessarily in the same habitats).

A substantial but dwindling forest of J. seravschanica is found in Ziarat District and Kalat District of Pakistan, as well as Zarghun Ghar near Quetta and Harboi including some are found in Koh-i-Takatu and Koh-i-Murdaar in northern and central Balochistan, and surrounding parts of southeastern Afghanistan.

The southernmost population of J. seravschanica is in the Al Hajar Mountains of Oman, where the junipers grow in the highest portions of the central range.

Conservation
Overgrazing by camels, goats and feral donkeys has impeded regeneration of woodlands at altitudes below 2,400 m in Oman.

References

seravschanica
Flora of Afghanistan
Flora of Iran
Flora of Kazakhstan
Flora of Kyrgyzstan
Flora of Oman
Flora of Pakistan
Flora of Tajikistan
Flora of Turkmenistan
Flora of Uzbekistan
Plants described in 1932